Elections to Shropshire Council were held on 2 May 2013 as part of the 2013 United Kingdom local elections. These were the second elections to the unitary authority created as part of local government restructuring in Shropshire, following on from the previous elections in 2009. All 74 seats in the 63 electoral divisions (consisting of 53 single member divisions, nine 2-member divisions and one 3-member electoral division) were up for election across Shropshire. At the same time, all town and parish council contested elections took place, most notably including Shrewsbury Town Council.

The Conservative party retained control of the Council, though with a slightly reduced majority, with 3 fewer seats compared to just prior to the election.

All locally registered electors (British, Irish, Commonwealth and European Union citizens) who were aged 18 or over on Thursday 2 May 2013 were entitled to vote in the local elections. Those who were temporarily away from their ordinary address (for example, away working, on holiday, in student accommodation or in hospital) were also entitled to vote in the local elections.

Previous council
Shropshire Council was Conservative controlled prior to the 2013 election, with 51 Conservative councillors immediately before the election. The Conservatives won 54 seats at the 2009 election, but lost three of these in by-elections during the term.

The Liberal Democrats won 11 seats at the 2009 election, but increased their numbers to 14 during the term, gaining at the by-elections from the Conservatives. Labour had 7 seats, Independent Community and Health Concern one seat, and a final seat was held by an independent.

Changes to divisions
There were no changes to division boundaries or seat allocations since 2009, but two divisions changed their names: 'Minsterley' to 'Rea Valley', and 'Selattyn and Gobowen' to 'Gobowen, Selattyn and Western Rhyn'.

Uncontested elections
In six electoral divisions the number of candidates nominated equalled the number of councillors to be elected, so these seats were uncontested. They were Corvedale, Shawbury, St Oswald, The Meres, Whitchurch North (two members), and Whitchurch South. The seven candidates elected unopposed were all Conservatives. This resulted in more than 20,000 people being refused a vote including the whole town of Whitchurch.

Results
The results, according to the council's website:

Summary

Abbey

Albrighton

Alveley and Claverley

Bagley

Battlefield

Bayston Hill, Column and Sutton

Belle Vue

Bishop's Castle

Bowbrook

Bridgnorth East and Astley Abbotts

Bridgnorth West and Tasley

Broseley

Brown Clee

Burnell

Castlefields and Ditherington

Cheswardine

Chirbury and Worthen

Church Stretton and Craven Arms

Clee

Cleobury Mortimer

Clun

Copthorne

Corvedale

Ellesmere Urban

Gobowen, Selattyn and Weston Rhyn
In 2009 this division was named Selattyn and Gobowen.

Harlescott

Highley

Hodnet

Llanymynech

Longden

Loton

Ludlow East

Ludlow North

Ludlow South

Market Drayton East

Market Drayton West

Meole

Monkmoor

Much Wenlock

Oswestry East

Oswestry South

Oswestry West

Porthill

Prees

Quarry and Coton Hill

Radbrook

Rea Valley
In 2009 this division was named Minsterley.

Ruyton and Baschurch

Severn Valley

Shawbury

Shifnal North

Shifnal South and Cosford

St Martin's

St Oswald

Sundorne

Tern

The Meres

Underdale

Wem

Whitchurch North

Whitchurch South

Whittington

Worfield

References

External links
 Shropshire Council 2013 Unitary and Town & Parish elections
 BBC News Shropshire council results

2013 English local elections
2013
21st century in Shropshire